Several vector diagrams are often used to demonstrate the physics underlying the Foucault pendulum.

Diagrams are provided to illustrate a pendulum located at the North Pole, equator, and 45 degrees N to show how the rotation of Earth in relation to the pendulum is observed, or not, at these locations. This is not a rigorous evaluation but is intended to convey information regarding the interaction of the two moving objects, the swinging pendulum and the rotating Earth. One of the great insights by Léon Foucault is that the time to observe a full rotation of the Earth increased by the inverse of the sine of the latitude.

In the examples, the pendulums are of great size to aid in the visualization of the pendulum swing in relation to the Earth (shown as blue circles). The pendulum is drawn so that 90 degrees of pendulum arc sweeps out 90 degrees of arc on the surface of the Earth. Views from the side, the front, and above (right, center, left) are provided to aid in the interpretation of the diagrams and arrows are provided to show the direction of the Earth's rotation. The schematic at the bottom of the each figure represents the range of swing of the pendulum as viewed from above and normalized to a standard orientation. The smaller arrows depict the magnitude of the relative velocity vector for the point on the Earth's surface in-line with the pendulum bob projected to the center of the Earth (the magnitude is shown since the schematic is two-dimensional, not three-dimensional). The pendulum bob is always affected by the force of gravity directed towards the center of the Earth. The force associated with the connection of the pendulum to a support structure directs the pendulum bob along the swing of the arc.

The support structure is dependent on the velocity of the surface of the Earth where it is located. The point of connection of the pendulum moves with the surface velocity vectors of the Earth at that latitude. At the equator the support-point moves with the equatorial rotation of the Earth and moves the pendulum swing along with this rotation. At the poles the support-point is located on the axis of the Earth so the support-point rotates but does not have a horizontal velocity component as it does at the equator (and a progressively less horizontal velocity component with increasing latitude). The plane of the pendulum swing, however, is independent of the surface velocity vectors underneath the swing since there is only one point of connection. The point of connection is configured such that the plane of pendulum swing is free to swing in any direction in relation to the structure of the connection point. The pendulum swing at the poles remains aligned toward a star if not forced to rotate with the support. As a result, it is observable that the Earth turns underneath the plane of swing of the pendulum.

Coriolis effect
The reason the rotation of the Earth in relation to the pendulum swing increases in time (decreases in effect) with decreasing latitude is related to the Coriolis Effect. As summarized in the Coriolis effect article, the effect is greatest in polar regions where the surface of the Earth is at right angles to the axis of rotation (the central axis of the pendulum aligns with the Earth's axis of rotation). The Coriolis effect decreases nearer the equator because the surface of the Earth is parallel to the axis of rotation (the central axis of the pendulum is perpendicular with the Earth's axis of rotation). Refer to the article discussing the Coriolis Effect for further details.

The motion of ballistics with changing latitude is not helpful to understanding the change with latitude of the observed rotation time of the pendulum. (This discussion point is different from what is stated in the reference book.) There is only one point of connection to the Earth for the swinging pendulum and that point of connection doesn't move in relation to the Earth. Because the plane of the pendulum swing is free to swing in relation to the rotation of the structure of the connection point, the rotation of the Earth is observable as directly related to the magnitude of the Coriolis effect. The examples show that the Earth turns underneath the plane of the pendulum swing and how this change in relationship can be interpreted at different latitudes by evaluating the surface velocity components underneath the swing of the pendulum.

Polar pendulum
For a pendulum swing at the North Pole it is shown that the surface velocity vectors of the Earth underneath one side of the pendulum swing are directed in opposition to the velocity vectors underneath the other side of the swing (see Figure 1). The Earth's rotation can then be observed in relation to the pendulum swing. At the North Pole the support-point of the pendulum swing is located on the axis of rotation of the Earth. No matter what vertical orientation is established by the plane of the swing, the relative velocity vectors of the Earth's surface on opposite sides and equidistant from the center point of the swing will be in opposition. The Earth turns underneath the plane of the pendulum swing that is established.

The support-point of the connection turns with the Earth and is depicted as freely suspended above the Earth. The plane of the pendulum swing does not turn with the support point and is not affected by the turning of the support point. The bob is free to swing in any direction in relation to the support (refer to a Charron chuck). For a pendulum at the pole, the plane of swing remains aligned with a star that the bob is swinging toward. A spot on the bob, however, turns with the support since the bob is not independent of the support point. The spot on the bob does not remain aligned with a star that the bob is swinging toward. This occurs whether the pendulum is swinging or not. If the bob is not allowed to turn with the support-point one twist of the connecting wire will occur in one day at the pole. If the connection apparatus of the pendulum to the bob and to the support were in a fixed relationship (and the connection not allowed to twist, for example, using a rigid rod pinned into place between two sides of the support), then once the plane of the pendulum swing is established in one direction, that plane would be forced to turn with the support and connection. The Earth's rotation would not be observable in relation to the pendulum swing with this type of connection.

Equatorial pendulum
At the equator the rotation of the Earth is not observable in relation to the pendulum swing because the plane of the pendulum swing is moving along with the rotation of the Earth and no net change in relationship occurs. It is shown by the diagrams that the surface velocity vectors of the Earth underneath the swing of the pendulum are either balanced in the same direction or included within the same plane as the pendulum swing.

For the equatorial pendulum with a swing in the longitudinal (north-south) direction the surface velocity vectors on either side of the swing are balanced in the same direction and the center-point of the pendulum swing is moving along with the direction of rotation (see Figure 2A).

For the equatorial pendulum with a swing in the latitudinal direction (along the equator) the surface velocity vectors on either side of the swing are not balanced in the same direction but are acting within the same x-y plane as the pendulum swing (see Figure 2B). These vectors are all of the same magnitude, that of the equatorial velocity. On one side of the pendulum swing the surface velocity vectors are angled upwards but on the opposite side the vectors are angled downwards. Since these vectors are all in the same plane as the pendulum swing there is no change of the surface in relationship to the plane of the pendulum swing.

Information and the pendulum sine law
The surface velocity due to the Earth's rotation is a maximum at the Equator and is equal to the circumference (pi × the diameter of the Earth) per 24 hours (or 3.14159 × 12,756 ÷ 24 = 1670 km/h = 1 equatorial velocity unit, EVU). The time of an Earth's rotation is inversely related to the angular velocity and the surface velocity (T = 1 day for 2 pi radians, or at the equator, 1 circumferential unit per 1 EVU = 40,075 km ÷ 1670 km/h ÷ 24 h/day = 1 day).

At a given latitude the surface velocity is equal to pi times the chord length parallel to the equator per 24 hours. This is equivalent to the cosine of the latitude × 1 EVU. At the poles the surface velocity is zero since zero distance is traveled. For a given longitude the surface velocity varies from 1 EVU at the equator to zero at the pole even though the angular velocities are all the same.

   =      =   

The ratio of the surface velocity at two given latitudes is equal to the ratio of the cosine for the two given latitudes.

   =      =   

The time to observe one full rotation of the Earth in relation to the plane of a swinging pendulum is one day at the poles (the minimum time) and cannot be observed (infinitely long, the maximum time) at the equator. One of the great insights by Léon Foucault is to deduce that the time to observe a full rotation of the Earth increased by the inverse of the sine of the latitude.

(ORTRP = observed rotation time in relation to the plane of the pendulum)

   =      =   

The Pendulum Sine Law also defines that the ratio of the observed Earth's rotation time at two separate latitudes in relation to a pendulum swing is equal to the inverse ratio of the sine of the two latitudes.

   =      =   

The sine of the latitude also indicates the degree of alignment of the pendulum central axis to the Earth's axis of rotation. At the poles the pendulum axis is parallel or aligned to the Earth's axis and the sine of 90° = 1. At the equator the pendulum axis is perpendicular to the Earth's axis and the sine of 0° = 0.

At intermediate latitudes the rotation of the Earth is observable in relation to the plane of the pendulum swing but the time to observe a full rotation depends on the latitude of the location. The time to observe a full rotation is equal to one day at the North Pole with the time increasing with decreasing latitude and not observable at the Equator (infinite length of time). The time increases because the central axis of the pendulum is aligned with the axis of rotation of the Earth at the North Pole and then the angle of misalignment increases as the latitude decreases to the point of perpendicularity at the Equator. The angular velocity in relation to the rotation of the Earth's axis that is imparted to the pendulum bob decreases with the cosine of the degree of misalignment of the central axis of the pendulum in comparison to the axis of rotation of the Earth. There are zero degrees of misalignment at the North Pole and the cosine of zero degrees equals 1. There are 90 degrees of misalignment at the Equator and the cosine of 90 degrees equals 0.

   =      =   

This equation is very similar to the equation for the reduction in surface velocity with longitude stated above.
This is equivalent to stating that the angular velocity that is imparted to the pendulum bob decreases with the sine of the latitude of the location (the sine of 90 degrees latitude equals 1; the sine of zero degrees latitude equals 0). The time to observe a complete rotation is inversely proportional to the angular velocity that is imparted to the pendulum bob in comparison to the angular velocity of the Earth. The statements above are thus equivalent to the inverse sine law for the observed time for a full rotation of the pendulum in relation to the rotation of the Earth.

There is only one point of connection to the Earth for the swinging pendulum and that point of connection doesn't move in relation to the Earth.

To approach the Pendulum Sine Law in basic steps:
The Earth's surface velocity decreases with increasing latitude directly proportional with the cosine of the latitude.
The degree of alignment of the pendulum axis in comparison to the Earth's axis increases with increasing latitude directly proportional with the sine of the latitude.
The angular velocity for the Earth is related to the circumferential surface velocity (2 × pi radians per day = 40,075 km per day at the equator).
The observed apparent rotation of the pendulum has an angular velocity (e.g., for the set of points at the end of the pendulum swing). This angular velocity is related to the apparent circumferential surface velocity of the pendulum.
The time of an Earth's rotation is inversely related to the angular velocity (T = 1 day per 2 × pi radians; or as calculated at the equator, 1 circumferential unit per 1 EVU), and inversely related to the circumferential surface velocity of 1 EVU.
The time to observe a full rotation of the Earth in relation to the plane of the pendulum is inversely related to the angular velocity and inversely related to the apparent circumferential surface velocity.
If it is proposed that;
The angular velocity that is observed for an Earth's rotation in relation to the plane of the pendulum is directly related to the degree of alignment of the pendulum axis to the Earth's axis (Coriolis effect).
Then it follows that,
The angular velocity that is observed for an Earth's rotation in relation to the plane of the pendulum increases with increasing latitude directly proportional with the sine of the latitude.
The time required to observe an Earth's rotation in relation to the plane of a pendulum decreases with increasing latitude inversely proportional with the sine of the latitude (the Pendulum Sine Law).

Forty-five-degrees north pendulum
For the 45° North pendulum with longitudinal swing (Figure 3A) the support point of the pendulum swing is moving along with the direction of rotation and the surface velocity vectors on either side of the swing are not balanced. The rotation of the Earth is observable in relation to the pendulum swing because a change in relationship to the surface occurs. At the south end of the pendulum swing the surface velocity vector (as projected to the center of the Earth) is that of the Equator, equal to 1 EVU. At the north end of the swing the velocity (as projected to the center of the Earth is that of the North Pole, equal to zero since zero distance is traveled in relation to the spinning Earth. Even though the surface velocities are different the angular velocities underneath the pendulum swing are all the same for this orientation.

For the 45° North pendulum with latitudinal swing (Figure 3B) the support point of the pendulum swing is moving along with the direction of rotation and the surface velocity vectors on either side of the swing are not balanced. The rotation of the Earth is observable in relation to the pendulum swing because a change in relationship to the surface occurs. On one side of the pendulum swing the surface velocity vectors are angled upwards and to the side but on the other side the vectors are angled downwards and to the opposite side. Since these vectors are not all in the same plane as the pendulum swing and are not balanced in the same direction there is a change in relationship between the surface and the plane of the pendulum swing.

Note: The schematic directly underneath the front view of the pendulum diagram is for velocity vectors projected towards the center of the Earth rather than straight down. It is much easier to interpret the magnitude of the vectors using the straight down projection that is shown on the right side of the diagram (the view from the top).

Evaluation of surface velocity vectors
The surface velocity vectors underneath the swing of the pendulum can be separated into three components (x, y, and z) for the 3-dimensional system in order to evaluate the vectors on opposite sides of the pendulum. The evaluation is to identify whether the vectors on each side of the pendulum swing are 1) balanced in the same direction, 2) acting in the same plane, or 3) unbalanced or in opposing directions. If the vector components on opposite sides of the pendulum swing are balanced in the same direction or act in the same plane of the pendulum then the rotation of the Earth will not be observable in relation to the swing of the pendulum. If the plane of the pendulum swing establishes the x-y plane then the z-component determines when the Earth's rotation will be observable and only if the z-component is not balanced in the same direction on each side. The magnitude of the opposing component is proportional to how long it takes for one full turn of the Earth to be observed in relation to the plane of the pendulum. The length of time is a minimum of one day at the poles, increases from the pole to the equator, and is not visible at the equator (infinitely long).

For any two points in the pendulum swing that are equidistant from the center of the swing there are two related points projected onto the surface of the Earth. These points can be used to determine the corresponding surface velocity components that are in opposition and not acting in the same plane of the swing. The magnitude of the difference between these two points (for a given latitude of the center-point) is a relative measure of the time to observe one full rotation. The ratio of the velocity vector difference to the corresponding points at the North Pole with the same equidistance from the center of the swing and the same projection to the surface can then be determined. The inverse ratio will determine the time observed for one full rotation of the pendulum swing in comparison to the duration at the pole of one day.

From the diagrams two points of the pendulum swing can be chosen to project straight down to two points on opposite sides of the Earth (180° apart). This makes it easy to obtain the velocity vector difference and then the time observed for a full rotation from the inverse ratio.

The examples show that the Earth turns underneath the plane of the pendulum swing and how this change in relationship can be interpreted at different latitudes.

For the North Pole pendulum (Figure 1) the velocity vector by inspection is 1 EVU on one side of the swing (as projected to the equator) and 1 EVU in the opposite direction on the other side of the swing. The difference between these two points is 2 EVU for the North Pole pendulum.

Using the same projection for the equatorial pendulum with longitudinal swing (Figure 2A) the velocity vector is 0 EVU on one side of the swing (for the North Pole) and 0 EVU on the other side of the swing (for the South Pole). The difference between these two points is 0 EVU for this arrangement. The time to observe a full rotation is infinitely long since the ratio divides by zero. For any two equidistant points the difference between the two vectors is zero, meaning the vectors are balanced in the same direction on each side of the pendulum swing.

Using the same projection for the equatorial pendulum with latitudinal swing (Figure 2B) the velocity vector is 1 EVU on each side of the swing and are in opposite directions. Even though the difference in the velocity vectors is 2 EVU, these vectors are acting in the same plane as the pendulum, therefore, cannot be observed by the pendulum swing. The z-component determines when the Earth's rotation will be observable and these are both zero.

Using the same projection for the 45° North pendulum with longitudinal swing (Figure 3A) the velocity vector is 0.707 EVU on one side of the (corresponding to 45° North on the opposite side of the world from the center point) and 0.707 EVU in the opposite direction on the other side of the swing (corresponding to 45° South). The difference between these two vectors is 1.414 EVU.

Using the same projection for the 45° North pendulum with longitudinal swing (Figure 3B) the velocity vector is 1 EVU but the z-component is only 0.707 EVU since the x-y plane is at 45°on one side of the swing (corresponding to the equator). On the other side of the swing the velocity vector is 0.707 EVU in the opposite direction (corresponding to the equator with a tilt of 45° to the x-y plane). The difference between these two vectors is 1.414 EVU.

The ratio of the velocity vectors for 45° to that of the pole is 1.414 ÷ 2.0 which equals 0.707. The time to observe the full rotation is then the inverse, or 1.414 days for a pendulum at 45° on the Earth.

Relative motion of the plane of the pendulum swing to the surface of the Earth
In order to observe the rotation of the Earth in relation to the plane of the pendulum swing there must be a basic difference in the two types of motion that are being compared. This basic difference is then manifested as (1) being able to 'observe' the change in position of the Earth in relation to the pendulum swing and (2) the time to observe a complete 'relative rotation' decreases with the sine of the latitude (decreases with an increase in the angle of alignment with the Earth's axis of rotation).

At the North Pole:

The central axis of the pendulum aligns with the axis of rotation of the Earth.
The central axis of the pendulum is always determined by the force of gravity directed towards the center of the Earth.

A pendulum bob at rest at the North Pole still has spin on the bob.
If a pendulum bob is hanging vertically at the North Pole and held in place, the bob is stationary but is rotating (spinning) with the Earth. Once the bob is released (but not swinging) it will continue to rotate (spin) unless one stops the rotation (spin) by forcing a spot on the side of the bob to always line up or point to one star. If the rotation of the bob is stopped then the connection wire will twist one turn every day unless there is a connection that is free to rotate (spin) (at either end of the wire or the support structure). If the bob at the North Pole is allowed to continue to rotate (spin) then it will and the wire won't twist one turn in one day.

The Foucault pendulum connection is constructed such that the pendulum is free to swing in any direction.
This is not the same thing as the support connection being free to rotate (spin). The swing of the pendulum is different from the rotation (spin) of the bob.
If a pendulum is hanging at the North Pole, before the bob is released, the bob is stationary but is rotating (spinning) with the Earth. Once the bob is released it will continue to rotate (spin) unless one stops the rotation (spinning) by forcing a spot on the side of the bob to always line up or point to one star.

If the bob is displaced from the central axis of the pendulum in preparation for swinging and held in place, then the bob will revolve about the central axis of the pendulum along with the rotation of the Earth and has an angular velocity equal to that of the Earth's angular velocity.
Before the bob is released there is a force that is exerted through the holding point of the bob that causes the bob to revolve about the pendulum axis and rotate (turn) with the Earth. This is because the holding point is attached to the surface of the Earth just like the structure of the pendulum is attached to the Earth.

Once the bob is displaced from the central axis of the pendulum and then released there no longer is a force acting on the bob that causes it to revolve about the central axis of the pendulum and rotate (turn) with the Earth.
As observed from an end-view of the swinging bob, the swing of the bob will always line up or swing towards one star (just like the axis of the Earth points at one star for the time periods considered) as the bob swings through the central axis of the pendulum. There can be a slight ellipsoid swing if the initial conditions of angular motion are not cancelled but there is no longer a force acting on the bob causing it to have an angular velocity after the bob is released. The plane of the swing of the pendulum bob is now independent of the surface of the earth which was imparting a force to the bob before it was released (through the holding point). As noted previously, the bob is still spinning with the Earth (a spot of the bob will spin with the Earth), even though the bob is no longer turning with the Earth. Thus the Earth continues to turn underneath the swing of the pendulum while the swing of the pendulum remains in a fixed plane that doesn't rotate (turn).

The point of significance is that the force imparting an angular velocity to the pre-released bob is no longer acting on the swinging bob. At the North Pole, this force takes one day for the direction of the force to complete a full circle since it takes one day for the Earth to rotate.

At the equator:

The central axis of the pendulum is perpendicular with the axis of rotation of the Earth.
The central axis of the pendulum is always determined by the force of gravity directed towards the center of the Earth.

A pendulum bob at rest at the Equator is still rotating with the Earth and there is no spin on the bob.
The pendulum is moving with the rotation of the Earth when located at the equator, as is the support structure, so one can't see the rotation of the Earth in relation to the pendulum. The observation of the relative motion of the Earth in relation to the pendulum depends on the location of the surface of the Earth where the initial conditions are established.

If a pendulum bob is hanging vertically at the Equator and held in place, the bob is stationary relative to the Earth and is rotating (turning) with the Earth. Once the bob is released (but not swinging) it continues to rotate (turn) with the Earth.

If the bob is displaced from the central axis of the pendulum in preparation for swinging and held in place, then the bob is still rotating (turning) with the Earth with the same angular velocity equal to that of the Earth's angular velocity. This is the same angular velocity when at rest. Since the central axis of the pendulum is perpendicular with the axis of rotation of the Earth this is not the same as the North Pole where the central axis is aligned with the axis of the Earth. The bob is not revolving about the axis of the pendulum when held in place.
Before the bob is released there is a force that is exerted through the holding point of the bob that causes the bob to rotate (turn) with the Earth. This is because the holding point is attached to the surface of the Earth just like the structure of the pendulum is attached to the Earth.

Once the bob is displaced from the central axis of the pendulum and then released there is still the same force acting on the bob that causes it to rotate (turn) with the Earth.
As observed from an end-view of the swinging bob, the swing of the bob will not line up or swing towards one star as the bob swings through the central axis of the pendulum. There will not be a slight ellipsoid swing in relation to the Earth since the initial conditions of angular motion are not changed and there is still a force acting on the bob (transmitted through the support structure, pendulum wire, and gravity) causing it to have an angular velocity after the bob is released. The plane of the swing of the pendulum bob is independent of the surface of the earth but is not independent of the pendulum system which is still imparting the same force to the bob as before it was released through the single support point of the pendulum. As noted previously, there is no spin on the bob (a spot of the bob does not change with respect to the Earth) and the bob is not revolving about the axis of the pendulum. Thus the Earth continues to turn underneath the swing of the pendulum and the swing of the pendulum continues to turn with the Earth since there is still a force acting on the bob of the pendulum swing.

The point of significance is that the same forces imparting an angular velocity to the pre-released bob are still acting on the swinging bob. At the Equator, the relative motion of the Earth is not observable because there is no change in the force imparting an angular velocity to the bob. This is because the central axis of the pendulum is perpendicular with the axis of rotation of the Earth.

For a separate, imaginative arrangement, if one could imagine a large pendulum structure that is mounted at the North Pole and free to not rotate with Earth (e.g., mounted on a platform that is free of the rotation (spin) of the Earth) but has long arms that allows the pendulum to swing at the Equator then the Earth's surface would move underneath the pendulum. The Earth doesn't rotate (turn) under the pendulum swing like at the North Pole but the equatorial plane rotates perpendicular to the pendulum swing. This is a very large pendulum and an idealized situation.

At intermediate latitudes:

The rotation of the Earth is observable in relation to the plane of the pendulum swing but the time to observe a full rotation depends on the latitude of the location. The time to observe a full rotation is equal to one day at the North Pole with the time increasing with decreasing latitude and not observable at the Equator (infinite length of time).

The time increases because the central axis of the pendulum is aligned with the axis of rotation of the Earth at the North Pole and then the angle of misalignment increases as the latitude decreases to the point of perpendicularity at the Equator.

The angular velocity that is imparted to the pendulum bob about the axis of the pendulum prior to release decreases with the cosine of the degree of misalignment of the central axis of the pendulum in comparison to the axis of rotation of the Earth (zero degrees of misalignment at the North Pole, cosine of zero degrees equals 1; 90 degrees of misalignment at the Equator, cosine of 90 degrees equals 0).

This is equivalent to stating that the angular velocity that is imparted to the pendulum bob prior to release decreases with the sine of the latitude of the location (the sine of 90 degrees latitude equals 1; the sine of zero degrees latitude equals 0).

When the bob is released there is no longer a force acting on the bob causing it to revolve about the central axis of the pendulum. That force that is no longer applied is less than that applied at the North Pole where axis are fully aligned.

The time to observe a complete rotation of the Earth is inversely proportional to the angular velocity that is not imparted to the pendulum bob.

The statements above are thus equivalent to the inverse sine law for the observed time for a full rotation of the pendulum in relation to the rotation of the Earth.

Final Note: There is only one point of connection to the Earth for the swinging pendulum and that point of connection doesn't move in relation to the Earth.

See also
Foucault pendulum
Coriolis effect

References
Aczel, Amir.  (2002). Pendulum: Léon Foucault and the Triumph of Science.  New York City: Atria Books. .

Pendulums